Hotelling's lemma is a result in microeconomics that relates the supply of a good to the maximum profit of the producer. It was first shown by Harold Hotelling, and is widely used in the theory of the firm.

Specifically, it states: The rate of an increase in maximized profits with respect to a price increase is equal to the net supply of the good. In other words, if the firm makes its choices to maximize profits, then the choices can be recovered from the knowledge of the maximum profit function.

Formal Statement
Let  denote a variable price, and  be a constant cost of each input. Let  be a mapping from the price to a set of feasible input choices . Let  be the production function, and  be the net supply.

The maximum profit can be written by

Proof for Hotelling's lemma
The lemma is a corollary of the envelope theorem.

Due to the optimality, the first order condition gives

QED

Application of Hotelling's lemma
Consider the following example. From this can be derived the profit-maximizing choices of inputs and the maximized profit function, a function just of the input and output prices, which is    
 

Hotelling's Lemma says that from the maximized profit function we can find the profit-maximizing choices of output and input by taking partial derivatives: 

Note that Hotelling's lemma gives the net supplies, which are positive for outputs and negative for inputs, since profit rises with output prices and falls with input prices.

Criticisms and empirical evidence 
A number of criticisms have been made with regards to the use and application of Hotelling's lemma in empirical work.

C. Robert Taylor points out that the accuracy of Hotelling's lemma is dependent on the firm maximizing profits, meaning that it is producing profit maximizing output  and cost minimizing input . If a firm is not producing at these optima, then Hotelling's lemma would not hold.

See also
Hotelling's law
Hotelling's rule
Supply and demand
Shephard's lemma

References

 
 
 
 

Lemmas